Kasim Kamenica (born 28 October 1954) is a Bosnian handball coach and former professional player.

Coaching career
Kamenica started his coaching career as the head coach of Radnički Goražde, Borac Uroševac and Pelister. In 1987–88 season, Kamenica worked with Badel 1862 Zagreb till 1993.

As of 2020, Kamenica has coached following teams: Partizan, Atomic Köflach, Kometal Gjorče Petrov, RK Vardar, Mladost Bogdanci, RD Prule 67, Slovenian national team, RK Bosna Sarajevo, Bosnia and Herzegovina national team, RK Celje, Nexe Našice, Montenegrin national team, RK Lovćen, MRK Goražde, Zağnos Kulübü, RK Pelister, RK Zagreb, RK Vojvodina and RK Vogošća.

During his stint with Slovenia between 2003 and 2004, Kamenica led the team to the silver medal at the 2004 European Championship.

Honours

Player
Radnički Goražde
Yugoslav Third League: 1974–75

Borac Uroševac
Yugoslav Second League (South): 1976–77, 1977–78

Železničar Niš
Yugoslav Cup: 1982

Coach
Yugoslavia U-21
IHF Men's Junior World Championship: 1987
IHF Men's Junior World Championship third place: 1989

Badel 1862 Zagreb
Yugoslav First League: 1988–89 

Kometal Gjorče Petrov
Macedonian First League: 1993–94, 1994–95, 1995–96
Macedonian Cup: 1995, 1996

RD Prule 67
Slovenian First League: 2001–02
Slovenian Cup: 2002

Slovenia
European Championship second place: 2004

Celje Pivovara Laško
Slovenian First League: 2006–07
Slovenian Cup: 2007
Slovenian Super Cup: 2007
EHF Champions Trophy finalist: 2007

Lovćen
Montenegrin First League: 2013–14
Montenegrin Cup: 2014

References

1954 births
Living people
People from Goražde
Bosnia and Herzegovina male handball players
Handball coaches
Bosnia and Herzegovina handball coaches
RK Zagreb coaches
Handball coaches of international teams